Chickamauga may refer to:

Entertainment
 "Chickamauga", an 1889 short story by American author Ambrose Bierce
 "Chickamauga", a 1937 short story by Thomas Wolfe
 "Chickamauga", a song by Uncle Tupelo from their 1993 album Anodyne
 Chickamauga (film), a 1962 short film by Robert Enrico based on Bierce's story

Military
 Battle of Chickamauga in the American Civil War
 Cherokee–American wars, between the Chickamauga Cherokee and Anglo-American settlers, 1776–1794
 Chickamauga Campaign, Civil War battles in northwestern Georgia, 1863

Places
 Chickamauga, Georgia
 Chickamauga Creek (Chattahoochee River), a stream in Georgia
 Chickamauga Creek, tributary of the Tennessee River
 Chickamauga Lake, on the Tennessee River
 Chickamauga Dam, a hydroelectric dam on the Tennessee River in Chattanooga, Tennessee

Other
 Chickamauga (tug boat), first diesel powered tug boat built in the United States
 Chickamauga Cherokee, a band of the Native American tribe following chief Dragging Canoe
 "The Rock of Chickamauga", a nickname for Gen. George Henry Thomas, from his service in the Battle of Chickamauga